Clausena brevistyla is a species of evergreen shrub to 6 m tall, in the citrus family Rutaceae. Found in New Guinea and Queensland, Australia.

References

External links

brevistyla
Flora of Queensland
Flora of New Guinea
Taxa named by Daniel Oliver